The 1994–95 Australian Baseball League Championship was won by the Waverley Reds, who finished the season with a 17-game winning streak. The Reds faced the 4th place Sydney Blues in the semi final and won 2–0, while the 2nd placed Perth Heat defeated the East Coast Cougars 2–1 to win a spot in the Championship Series. The Reds won the first two games of the championship series 5-1 and 4–2, with the third game not being required.

Ladder

Championship series

Semi Final 1: Game 1: 1st Vs 4th at Moorabin Oval

Semi Final 1: Game 2: 1st Vs 4th at Moorabin Oval

Semi Final 2: Game 1: 2nd Vs 3rd at Perth

Semi Final 2: Game 2: 2nd Vs 3rd at Perth

Semi Final 2: Game 3: 2nd Vs 3rd at Perth

Final Series: Game 1: Winner Semi Final 1 Vs Winner Semi Final 2 at Moorabin Oval

Final Series: Game 2: Winner Semi Final 1 Vs Winner Semi Final 2 at Moorabin Oval

Awards

Top Stats

All-Star Team

References

Australian Baseball League (1989–1999) seasons
1994 in Australian baseball
1995 in Australian baseball